Arroyo Colorado is a river in Hidalgo, Cameron and Willacy Counties, Texas, that flows mostly eastward some  from Lake Llano Grande into the Laguna Madre.

Arroyo Colorado is a name derived from Spanish meaning "red creek bed".

See also
 Arroyo City, Texas
 Arroyo Colorado Estates, Texas
List of rivers of Texas

References

USGS Geographic Names Information Service
USGS Hydrologic Unit Map - State of Texas (1974)

Rivers of Texas
Bodies of water of Hidalgo County, Texas
Bodies of water of Cameron County, Texas
Bodies of water of Willacy County, Texas